Catface may mean:

Cat-facing, fruit deformity
Cat Face, cartoon character